Ontario, one of the 13 provinces and territories of Canada, is located in east-central Canada. It is Canada's most populous province by a large margin, accounting for nearly 40 per cent of all Canadians, and is the second-largest province in total area. Ontario is fourth-largest in total area when the territories of the Northwest Territories and Nunavut are included. It is home to the nation's capital city, Ottawa, and the nation's most populous city, Toronto.

Vital statistics
Birth Rate: 9.7/1,000 people (2021)

Death Rate: 8.1/1,000 people (2021)

Life Expectancy at birth: 81 years (2006 est)

Infant Mortality rate: 5.2 (2007 est)

Age structure

Population history

Source: Statistics Canada
 % Province of Canada population

Population geography

Census Metropolitan Areas

Ethnic origins
As of 2016 census.

Note: The table takes dual responses (for example if someone is French-Canadian they would be added to both French and Canadian). Some places of one's ethnic origin do not refer to a single specified country of origin, i.e. Spanish refers to people from Spanish speaking countries such as Colombia, Spain, Mexico, Cuba and others; or East Indian where the respondents origin could be from Pakistan, India, Nepal, Bangladesh, etc.; and the list contains about 200 nationalities known to reside in the province. However, there are options for the respondent to identify the country alone.

As regards ethnic origins and Census Metropolitan Area (CMA) of highest concentration (minimum: 1%):

Future Projections

Visible minorities and Aboriginals

There is a striking difference between the Toronto CMA (5,862,850) and the rest of Ontario (7,379,310); in particular, in the Toronto CMA visible minorities account for 51.4% of the population (3,011,900), whereas in the rest of Ontario the percentage of visible minorities in the overall population is much lower, at 11.8% (873,685). Back in 1996,1,338,095 of 4,232,905 Toronto CMA residents belonged to a visible minority, i.e. 31.6% of its population; regarding the rest of Ontario, only 343,950 of its 6,409,885 residents, i.e. 5.4%, were visible minorities.

Language
The following figures are from the 2016 census. The tables includes languages that were selected by at least 0.99 per cent of respondents. Respondents to the census are able to provide multiple responses for questions relating to knowledge of languages, and mother tongue.

Knowledge of languages
The question on knowledge of languages allows for multiple responses. The following figures are from the 2021 Canadian Census and the 2016 Canadian Census, and lists languages that were selected by at least one per cent of respondents.

Mother tongue

Religion

Of Christian faith: Catholic at 3,976,610 (31.4%); United Church 952,465 (7.5%); Anglican 774,560 (6.1%); Presbyterian 319,585 (2.5%); Christian Orthodox 297,710 (2.4%); Baptist 244,650 (1.9%); Pentecostal 213,945 (1.7%); Lutheran 163,460 (1.3%); Other Christian 1,224,300 (9.7%)
Source: Statistics Canada
StatsCan 2011 National Household Survey

Migration

Immigration 
Ontario is a very diverse province. For example, 54.8% of the population of Toronto was born outside Canada, which is the second-largest percentage of immigrants in a single city on Earth, after Miami. Hamilton is ranked the third-most diverse urbanized area in Canada (after Toronto and Vancouver). 

The 2021 census reported that immigrants (individuals born outside Canada) comprise 4,206,585 persons or 30.0 percent of the total population of Ontario.

Recent immigration 
The 2021 Canadian census counted a total of 584,680 people who immigrated to Ontario between 2016 and 2021.

Interprovincial migration 

Ontario's interprovincial migration rate have shifted over the years. It was negative in the 1970s, positive in the 1980s, but then negative again in the 1990s. It went back to the positive in around the time of the turn of the millennium for a few years, but has been in the negatives constantly from 2003 to 2015, and has been in the positives since then. Over the period from 1971 to 2015, Ontario was the province who experience the second lowest levels of interprovincial in-migration and out-migration, second only to Quebec.

Source: Statistics Canada

See also

 Demographics of Canada
 List of municipalities in Ontario
 List of census divisions of Ontario
 Population of Canada by province and territory

Notes

References 

Ontario
Ontario society